This page documents the tornadoes and tornado outbreaks of 1987, primarily in the United States. Most tornadoes form in the U.S., although some events may take place internationally. Tornado statistics for older years like this often appear significantly lower than modern years due to fewer reports or confirmed tornadoes.

Synopsis

1987 started with a fairly slow spring, followed by a much more active late spring/summer. Two particularly devastating tornadoes of 1987 were the Saragosa, Texas tornado of May 22 and the Edmonton, Alberta tornado of July 31. The fall and early winter could best be described as "average" in terms of tornado activity, with a significant outbreak on November 14 and 15, and a killer F3 in December.

Events
Confirmed tornado total for the entire year 1987 in the United States.

January
There were 6 tornadoes confirmed in the US in January.

February
There were 19 tornadoes confirmed in the US in February.

February 28
The tornado traveled a distance of  killing six people, injuring 350 others, and causing $28.5 million in damages.

March
There were 38 tornadoes confirmed in the US in March.

March 22
A small outbreak of nine tornadoes occurred in Oklahoma, Texas, and Kansas. Including a quarter-mile wide F3 tornado in Lipscomb County, Texas, which narrowly missed the communities of Locust Grove and Lipscomb.

April
There were 20 tornadoes confirmed in the US in April.

May
There were 126 tornadoes confirmed in the US in May.

May 22

On the evening of May 22, a short-lived but powerful F4 tornado struck Saragosa, Texas killing 30 people and injuring over 100. Many were killed attending a graduation ceremony for pre-school children at the Catholic Hall of Our Lady of Guadalupe Church. 80% of the residential area was reported as destroyed.

May 25
A tornado outbreak occurred in Texas, including two F3 tornadoes. The first F3 touched down in Hansford County, Texas, just south of the community of Gruver, where it damaged outbuilding and trees, before it went onto damage a hangar at Gruver Municipal Airport. The second F3 touched down in Ochiltree County, where it had a brief but damaging path, with a max width of 0.4 miles wide, the tornado afflicted damage in Waka, due to missile-like debris.

June
There were 132 tornadoes confirmed in the US.

June 5
A tornado in Idaho caused 3 injuries, the highest number of tornado related injuries for the state.

A tornado in Los Angeles County, California causes approximately $25 Million in damages as the most destructive the state has seen. No deaths or injuries were reported.

June 16 (Poland)
A tornado hit the city of Białystok, the largest city in northeastern Poland, and destroyed 100 homes.

June 18
An F2 tornado hit Casper, Wyoming and caused $250,000 in damage, making it the most destructive tornado to hit the city.

July
There were 163 tornadoes confirmed in the US in July.

July 2
A tornado touched down in Denver, Colorado, just to the northeast of Stapleton Airport. It did not do any serious damage as it missed the airport and stayed in nearby fields.

July 11
A tornado outbreak occurred on July 11, mainly effecting the states of Minnesota, and Michigan, primarily the Upper Peninsula of Michigan. The main attraction of the event touched down in Dickinson County, which was rated F3, it maintained a consistent damage path through the wilderness near Vulcan, blocking roads, and destroying a fire building. After crossing into Menominee County, the tornado damaged outbuildings and a house in an isolated location was destroyed in northern Menominee County. The tornado then moved into Delta County, where it continued to chew through trees. The tornado then entered a farming area, where it was seen by at least 15 people, some of which described it "like a thousand tires stacked up, burning and smoking." In that area a large barn was moved off its foundation, and the tornado continued into a wooded area, where it dissipated.

July 21

A rare high-altitude tornado struck Wyoming, uprooting over one million trees along its 24-mile path. The tornado was rated F4, and is among the most violent high-altitude tornadoes ever recorded.

July 27
A landspout tornado struck Twentynine Palms, California with no serious damage. It was caught on film.

July 31 (Canada)

In Edmonton, Alberta, Canada an F4 tornado remained on the ground for an hour, cutting a swath of destruction 30.8 kilometres (19.1 mi) long and up to 1,300 metres (0.81 mi) wide in places. The tornado killed 27 people and injured over 300 more.

July 31 (China)
An outbreak of tornadoes occurred in northeastern China, including an estimated F4 that hit Keshan County, Heilongjiang.

August
There were 63 tornadoes confirmed in the US in August.

September
There were 19 tornadoes confirmed in the US in September.

October
There was 1 tornado confirmed in the US in October.

November
There were 55 tornadoes confirmed in the US in November.

November 15–16
A large outbreak struck the Ark-La-Tex region, spawning 50 tornadoes (four rated as high as F3). There were 11 fatalities, 10 of which were in Texas.

December
There were 14 tornadoes confirmed in the US in December.

December 14
An F3 tornado struck West Memphis, Arkansas, before crossing the Mississippi River into Tennessee, causing 21 injuries in the Northhaven housing complex. In total, this storm caused six fatalities and 121 injuries. It was part of a small outbreak of five tornadoes.

See also
 Tornado
 Tornadoes by year
 Tornado records
 Tornado climatology
 Tornado myths
 List of tornado outbreaks
 List of F5 and EF5 tornadoes
 List of North American tornadoes and tornado outbreaks
 List of 21st-century Canadian tornadoes and tornado outbreaks
 List of European tornadoes and tornado outbreaks
 List of tornadoes and tornado outbreaks in Asia
 List of Southern Hemisphere tornadoes and tornado outbreaks
 List of tornadoes striking downtown areas
 Tornado intensity
 Fujita scale
 Enhanced Fujita scale

References

External links
 U.S. tornadoes in 1987 - Tornado History Project
 Tornado deaths monthly

 
1987 meteorology
Tornado-related lists by year
Torn